Modern Mirror is the third studio album by the American darkwave band Drab Majesty. The album was released on July 12, 2019, by Dais Records.

Critical reception

On its release, Modern Mirror received favorable reviews from music critics. At Metacritic, which assigns a normalized rating out of 100 to reviews from mainstream publications, the album received an average score of 80, based on 6 reviews.

Track listing

Personnel
Modern Mirror personnel adapted from Discogs.

Drab Majesty
 Deb Demure (Andrew Clinco) – guitars, vocals, synths, drum programming
 Mona D (Alex Nicolaou) – keyboards, vocals

Guest musicians
 Jasamine White-Gluz – additional vocals on "Long Division"
 Justin Meldal-Johnson – bass guitar on "Out of Sequence"
 Joshua Eustis – additional keyboards

Production
  Joshua Eustis – production, mixing
  Deb Demure – co-production
  Dave Cooley – mastering
  Nedda Afsari – photography
  Juan Mendez – design, layout

References 

2019 albums